Ceramea brunneica is a species of moth of the family Tortricidae. It is found in Brunei.

The wingspan is about 18 mm. The ground colour of the forewings is cream, suffused with pale cinnamon and with grey in the dorsal half of the wing postmedially. The costa is sprinkled and strigulated (finely streaked) with brown. The markings are dark brown. The hindwings are pale brownish cream, but cream on the periphery.

Etymology
The species name refers to the country of origin of the species.

References

Archipini
Moths described in 2008
Moths of Asia
Taxa named by Józef Razowski